HSwMS Folke was the last of the seven s built for the Swedish Navy in the mid-1870s. Unlike her sisters, her gun turret was fixed to the rear. The ship was placed in reserve in 1919 and ultimately sold in 1942.

Design and description
The Hildur-class monitors were designed by Lieutenant John Christian d'Ailly, from a proposal by John Ericsson, for the defense of Lake Mälaren and the Stockholm archipelago. They had fixed turrets mounting  guns and someone on the defense staff realized that they could be destroyed while retreating because none of the ships could fire to their rear. Folke was designed to protect her sisters in that situation as her turret was fixed to the rear.

Her crew numbered 48 officers and men. The ship had a rudder at bow and stern.

The Hildur-class ships had two horizontal twin-cylinder steam engines, each driving a single propeller. Their engines were powered by two cylindrical boilers. The ships carried  of coal.

Armament
Folke was equipped with one  M/69 rifled breech loader,  mounted in a long, fixed, oval-shaped turret that faced to the rear. The ship also mounted two  guns.

Folke was rearmed with a  quick-firing gun as well as three  quick-firing guns sometime in the 1890s or the early 1900s.

Armor

Construction and service
Folke was launched in 1875 by Motala Verkstad at Norrköping. She was decommissioned in 1919 and was eventually converted into a heating plant for mothballed submarines. The ship was sold in 1942 for conversion to a barge.

Footnotes

References
 
 
 

  

1875 ships
Ships built in Norrköping
Hildur-class monitors